The small unit riverine craft (SURC) is a rigid-hull, armed and armored patrol boat used by the U.S. Marines and U.S. Navy to maintain control of rivers and inland waterways. They are similar in size and purpose to the much older Patrol Boat, River vessels used during the Vietnam War.

According to the Navy, “The primary mission of the SURC is to provide tactical mobility and a limited weapons platform for the ground combat element of a Marine Air Ground Task Force in littoral and riverine environments.” The boat's secondary mission includes “command and control, reconnaissance, logistic/resupply, medevac, counter-drug operations, humanitarian assistance, peacekeeping, and noncombatant evacuation operations.”

The boats are built by Raytheon Naval & Maritime Integrated Systems, with a contract to build up to 100 boats. Raytheon's contract partners are SAFE Boats International of Bremerton, Washington and Boat Master of Fort Myers, Florida.

The boat is transportable by C-130 Hercules aircraft and can be launched from its trailer at lakeside.

History
The boats were first deployed to Iraq and were used there by the now deactivated U.S. Marine Corps' Small Craft Company, being later turned over to the United States Navy Riverine Squadrons - units of the Navy Expeditionary Combat Command (NECC) that used the boats to patrol strategic areas of Iraq.

On Sept. 25 2013, the United States transferred six SURC patrol boats to the Philippine Marine Corps to provide a platform for command and control, reconnaissance, logistic/resupply, medical evacuation, counter-drug operations, humanitarian assistance, peacekeeping and non-combatant evacuation operations & will be deployed to augment sea-based forces addressing terrorism and lawlessness.

Other characteristics

See also
Combat Boat 90 - known as 'Riverine Command Boat' in US Navy service.
Fast Patrol Craft

References

External links
U.S. Navy: “USMC Family of Small Craft”
GlobalSecurity.org: “Small Unit Riverine Craft (SURC)”

United States Marine Corps equipment
Equipment of the United States Navy
Patrol vessels of the United States Navy
Riverine warfare
Military boats
Landing craft